St Alkmund's Church is a Church of England parish church on Kedleston Road in Derby. It was built in the 1970s to replace the Victorian St Alkmund's Church which had been demolished in 1968 to enable the construction of the Derby inner ring road, St Alkmund's Way (A601).

When the Victorian church was demolished, traces of several earlier churches were revealed, stretching back to the 9th century. Artefacts found included the stone sarcophagus of Alkmund of Derby, now in Derby Museum and Art Gallery.

The new church was consecrated in 1972. The parish of St Werburgh's was combined with St Alkmund's in 1984.

In December 2017 it was announced that the incumbent Revd Canon Jean Burgess was to become the next Archdeacon of Bolton, Diocese of Manchester. 
In March 2020, the previous curate, James Durrant, was appointed as Assistant Curate (Associate Minister) of St Alkmund's and Priest-in-Charge of St Paul's, Chester Green. 

Following the sad death of vicar-designate Ian Moutford in December 2019, the church went into vacancy for a short period with Revd Susie Curtis acting as Interim Associate Minister and Paul Desborough as curate. 

On 7th November 2021 the Revd Mina Munns was licensed as Vicar of St Alkmund's and in 2022 was joined by the Revd Fay Price as Associate Curate (alongside James Durrant).

St Alkmund's today is an active, family-focused church who meet in the building every Sunday morning at 10am and also stream Live to their YouTube Channel. Multiple other services and activities are advertised through their social media pages on Instagram and Facebook.

References 

Churches in Derby
Derby, St Alkmund's (new) Church